Ləzir (also, Lyazir) is a village in the Yardymli Rayon of Azerbaijan.  The village forms part of the municipality of Bərcan.

References 

Populated places in Yardimli District